Antonio Martín (born 18 June 1918) is a Spanish former professional cyclist. Martín was professional between 1939 and 1948, earning 13 professional victories, including a stage of the Vuelta a España. He also competed in the Vuelta a España five times (1941, 1942, 1945, 1946, 1948).

Biography
Antonio Martín was born in Vitoria-Gasteiz, Basque Country on 18 June 1918. At the end of the 1948 season, he retired from cycling. He was known as a climbing specialist, and finished in the top 10 of the Vuelta a España twice, and won a stage in 1941.

Major results

1939
 3rd Barcelona-Madrid
 4th Clásica a los Puertos
1940
 1st Álava
 2nd Clásica a los Puertos
 8th Overall Volta a Catalunya
1941
 1st Stage 5 Vuelta a Navarra
 2nd Road race, National Road Championships
 7th Overall Vuelta a España
1st Stage 9
 7th Overall Volta a Catalunya
1st Stage 9
1942
 1st  Derny, National Track Championships
 1st Overall Circuito Castilla-Leon-Asturias
1st Stage 2
 1st Stage 3 Vuelta a Levante
 1st Stage 3 Circuito del Norte
 9th Subida al Naranco
1943
 1st  Derny, National Track Championships
 3rd Road race, National Road Championships
 4th Overall Vuelta a Levante
1st Stages 1 & 6
 10th Overall Volta a Catalunya
1944
 1st Overall Vuelta a Levante
1st Stage 7
 1st Road race, Barcelona Road Championships
 2nd Road race, National Road Championships
1945
 1st Stage 1b Volta a Catalunya
 2nd Trofeo Jaumendreu
 2nd Trofeo Masferrer
 5th Overall Vuelta a España
1946
 3rd Trofeo del Sprint
 7th Trofeo Masferrer
1947
 4th Overall Tour of Galicia
1st Stage 8

Vuelta a España results
 1941: 7
 1942: DNF
 1943: 5
 1946: 16
 1948: DNF

References

External links
 

1918 births
Possibly living people
Cyclists from the Basque Country (autonomous community)
Spanish male cyclists
Spanish Vuelta a España stage winners
Sportspeople from Vitoria-Gasteiz